The Sirens is a 2013 studio album by jazz saxophonist Chris Potter, his first to be released on the ECM label. It features Potter with longtime collaborators, pianist Craig Taborn and bassist Larry Grenadier, along with keyboardist David Virelles and drummer Eric Harland.

Reception

The Allmusic review by Thom Jurek awarded the album 4 stars stating "Potter's vision and compositions on The Sirens never lose sight of his goal: portraying the eternal essence of humanity in the mythos of his subject; his poetic lyricism as a soloist, and his empathy as a bandleader are consummate".

The Guardian 's John Fordham noted "Only the faintly niggling sensation of this being a classically authoritative Potter jazz set with some suitable concept-exotica embroidery blunts The Sirens''' impact".
 
All About Jazz correspondent John Kelman observed "Through it all, there's no mistaking this for anything but a Chris Potter record, but with The Sirens he's delivered one unlike any he's done before. An eclectic album that couldn't have happened without what's come before, it's nevertheless a signpost of significant change, as the saxophonist opens himself up compositionally—and, from a performance perspective, one that, if he can keep this remarkable group together, promises even better things to come". Another review by Ian Patterson stated "The Sirens will go down as one of Potter's best, but this is assuredly a collective triumph".

Track listingAll compositions by Chris Potter except as indicated''
 "Wine Dark Sea" - 8:47   
 "Wayfinder" - 6:49   
 "Dawn (With Her Rosy Fingers)" - 7:23   
 "The Sirens" - 8:38   
 "Penelope" - 7:14   
 "Kalypso" - 8:24   
 "Nausikaa" - 5:40   
 "Stranger at the Gate" - 8:12   
 "The Shades" (Potter, David Virelles) - 2:11

Personnel
Chris Potter - soprano saxophone, tenor saxophone, bass clarinet
Craig Taborn - piano
David Virelles - prepared piano, celesta, harmonium
Larry Grenadier - double bass
Eric Harland - drums

References

Chris Potter (jazz saxophonist) albums
2013 albums
ECM Records albums
Albums produced by Manfred Eicher